Austin Lee Basis (born September 14, 1976) is an American actor.

Early life and education
Basis was born in Brooklyn, New York, where he attended Mark Twain Intermediate School 239 and Midwood High School.  While majoring in theatre at Binghamton University, he performed in the title roles of "Rosencrantz & Guildenstern are Dead" and "I Hate Hamlet", in addition to several original productions.  After graduation, he joined the Actors Studio MFA program, where he received a Master of Fine Arts in Acting. He is Jewish.

Career
As a struggling actor in New York, Basis worked as a bartender, a bouncer, a busboy, a cater-waiter, and a substitute teacher while performing in independent and student films, and Off-Off Broadway plays. He also co-created and performed in an improv & sketch comedy show called "Mmm...Comedy" that ran for seven months.

Television 

Basis's most prominent television role has been on the recent incarnation of Beauty & the Beast, where he played J.T. Forbes.

His television debut was in the Comedy Central film Porn 'n Chicken (2002) (TV). In 2004 he was cast in an episode of Law & Order: Criminal Intent (2001). He then landed a role in a Warner Brothers TV pilot for FOX called Spellbound (2004) with Christine Baranski, Barry Bostwick and Dave Annable.

Since then, Basis has appeared on numerous TV shows, including Studio 60 on the Sunset Strip (2006), Supernatural (2005), Life on Mars (2008) and Life Unexpected (2010–2011). His film credits include Dorian Blues (2004), Boxboarders! (2007), American Zombie (2007), My Sassy Girl (2008), and The Other End of the Line (2008).

He has appeared in a number of commercials as well, including spots for Toys 'R' Us, Wendy's, Dr. Pepper, State Farm, and Burger King. He also plays Benjamin Bankes the Pig in the Ad Council's "Feed the Pig" campaign.

Personal life
Basis has type 1 diabetes, and he has worked as an activist to promote awareness.

Filmography

Film

Television

Web

References

External links

1976 births
Living people
Jewish American male actors
American male film actors
American male television actors
Male actors from New York City
21st-century American male actors
People from Sea Gate, Brooklyn
People with type 1 diabetes
21st-century American Jews